Jones & Jury (also known as Jones and Jury) is an American nontraditional arbitration-based reality court show presided over by former Brooklyn Prosecutor and District Attorney Star Jones.

Jones & Jury was the second show of its kind (arbitration-based reality show), behind only The People's Court.

The series ran in first-run syndication for eight months from September 1994 until May 1995. It was produced by Lighthearted Entertainment.

The program made Star Jones the first African American to preside over a court show and the first female to preside over arbitration-based reality courtroom programming, only Joseph Wapner preceding her.

Jones became well known shortly following her stint on Jones & Jury for her 9 seasons on daytime talk show The View, from 1997-98 through 2005-06. On January 10, 2022, it was announced that Jones would return to the court show genre, presiding over longest-running courtroom series Divorce Court beginning with the show's milestone 40th season in September 19, 2022.

Format
Jones & Jury was a combination talk/arbitration-based reality court show. Small claims cases from courts in southern California were tried. Audience participation set this show apart from other programs in the genre. Not only did the judge get to question the litigants but so did the audience. After Jones dispensed common sense jury instructions, the audience voted on a verdict. In the end, Jones decided who won or lost in what were legally binding decisions. The cases ran from minor to major issues, such as credit card fraud among family members.

References

External links

1994 American television series debuts
1995 American television series endings
Court shows